Gary Morris is the debut studio album by the American country music artist of the same name.  It was released on March 15, 1982 via Warner Bros. Records.  The album includes the singles "Headed for a Heartache", "Don't Look Back" and "Dreams Die Hard".

Track listing

Personnel
Adapted from liner notes.

Acoustic Guitar: Mark Casstevens, Gary Morris, Rafe Van Hoy, Paul Worley
Electric Guitar: Fred Newell, Paul Worley
Bass Guitar: David Hungate, Joe Osborn
Steel Guitar: Sonny Garrish
Keyboards: Dennis Burnside
Drums: Eddie Bayers
Synthesizer: Shane Keister
Harmonica: Mark Casstevens
Lead Vocals: Gary Morris
Background Vocals: Jessica Boucher, Steve Brantley, Paulette Carlson, Bruce Dees, Gary Morris, Dennis Wilson, Marcia Wood, Paul Worley

Strings performed by The Nashville String Machine, arranged by Dennis Burnside.

Chart performance

References

1982 debut albums
Gary Morris albums
Albums produced by Paul Worley
Warner Records albums